This article lists described species of the family Asilidae start with letter T.

A
B
C
D
E
F
G
H
I
J
K
L
M
N
O
P
Q
R
S
T
U
V
W
Y
Z

Genus Tanatchivia
 Tanatchivia chimaera (Hradský, 1983)
 Tanatchivia hradskyi (Tomasovic & Smets, 2007)

Genus Taperigna
 Taperigna diogmitiformis (Artigas & Papavero, 1991)

Genus Taracticus
 Taracticus aciculatus (Pritchard, 1938)
 Taracticus argentifacies (James, 1953)
 Taracticus contusus (Cockerell, 1910)
 Taracticus guerrerensis (Pritchard, 1938)
 Taracticus nigrimystaceus (Williston, 1901)
 Taracticus nigripes (Williston, 1901)
 Taracticus paulus (Pritchard, 1938)
 Taracticus renovatus (Cockerell, 1911)
 Taracticus ruficaudus (Curran, 1930)
 Taracticus rufipennis (Macquart, 1847)
 Taracticus similis (Williston, 1901)
 Taracticus vitripennis (Bellardi, 1861)

Genus Taurhynchus
 Taurhynchus aurolineatus (Macquart, 1846)
 Taurhynchus barbiventris (Rondani, 1850)
 Taurhynchus bromleyi (Curran, 1931)
 Taurhynchus camposi (Curran, 1934)
 Taurhynchus cruentus (Lynch & Arribálzaga, 1880)
 Taurhynchus dina (Curran, 1934)
 Taurhynchus fervidus (Curran, 1934)
 Taurhynchus flavipennis (Macquart, 1846)
 Taurhynchus guianicus (Curran, 1934)
 Taurhynchus mystaceus (Macquart, 1846)
 Taurhynchus rubricornis (Macquart, 1838)
 Taurhynchus salti (Curran, 1934)
 Taurhynchus tibialis (Macquart, 1850)
 Taurhynchus vittatus (Lynch & Arribálzaga, 1880)
 Taurhynchus xanthopterus (Wiedemann, 1828)

Genus Templasilus
 Templasilus bolivari (Arias, 1912)

Genus Thallosia
 Thallosia congoicola (Oldroyd, 1970)

Genus Theodoria
 Theodoria kimurai (Hradský & Hüttinger, 1984)

Genus Thereutria
 Thereutria pulchra (Schiner, 1868)
 Thereutria pulchripes (White, 1918)
 Thereutria tesselata (Hardy, 1930)

Genus Theromyia
 Theromyia nana (Pritchard, 1941)
 Theromyia pegnai (Artigas, 1970)

Genus Theurgus
 Theurgus kerzneri (Lehr, 1974)
 Theurgus zimini (Richter, 1966)

Genus Threnia
 Threnia acanthura (Wulp, 1898)
 Threnia carbonaria (Wiedemann, 1828)
 Threnia kelleri (Carrera, 1952)
 Threnia longipennis (Schiner, 1868)
 Threnia lugens (Schiner, 1868)
 Threnia microtelus (Wulp, 1898)
 Threnia rabelloi (Carrera, 1952)
 Threnia therimachus (Walker, 1851)

Genus Tipulogaster
 Tipulogaster lancea (Tomasovic, 2002)

Genus Tocantinia
 Tocantinia misera (Walker, 1854)

Genus Tolmerus
 Tolmerus alamosae (Martin, 1975)
 Tolmerus albiceps (Becker, 1923)
 Tolmerus angustifrons (Loew, 1849)
 Tolmerus atripes (Loew, 1854)
 Tolmerus baezi (Hradský & Bosák, 2006)
 Tolmerus bolgaricus (Lehr, 1981)
 Tolmerus calvoides (Lehr, 1981)
 Tolmerus calvus (Lehr, 1972)
 Tolmerus costalis (Theodor, 1980)
 Tolmerus cowini (Hobby, 1946)
 Tolmerus cyrnaeus (Oldroyd, 1946)
 Tolmerus exiguus (Lehr, 1981)
 Tolmerus eximius (Becker, 1923)
 Tolmerus facialis (Becker, 1913)
 Tolmerus ferox (Becker, 1923)
 Tolmerus flavibarbatus (Becker, 1914)
 Tolmerus herbicola (Lehr, 1967)
 Tolmerus hermonensis (Theodor, 1980)
 Tolmerus hisamatsui (Tagawa, 1981)
 Tolmerus illucens (Becker, 1923)
 Tolmerus impiger (Becker, 1923)
 Tolmerus incommunis (Becker, 1923)
 Tolmerus inhonestus (Lehr, 1972)
 Tolmerus jacutensis (Lehr, 1975)
 Tolmerus katharinae (Theodor, 1980)
 Tolmerus lesinensis (Palm, 1876)
 Tolmerus lhassae (Tomasovic, 2005)
 Tolmerus maculipes (Lehr, 1972)
 Tolmerus major (Becker, 1907)
 Tolmerus maximus (Schiner, 1868)
 Tolmerus micans (Meigen, 1820)
 Tolmerus mirandus (Lehr, 1981)
 Tolmerus mongolicus (Moucha & Hradský, 1966)
 Tolmerus novarensis (Schiner, 1868)
 Tolmerus oromii (Hradský & Bosák, 2006)
 Tolmerus pamirensis (Lehr, 1981)
 Tolmerus pauper (Becker, 1923)
 Tolmerus pawaneeae (Martin, 1975)
 Tolmerus perfectus (Becker, 1923)
 Tolmerus poecilogaster (Loew, 1849)
 Tolmerus richterae (Lehr, 1981)
 Tolmerus rufescens (Lehr, 1975)
 Tolmerus rufostriatus (Theodor, 1980)
 Tolmerus shachristanicus (Lehr, 1981)
 Tolmerus socotrae (Geller-Grimm, 2002)
 Tolmerus strandi (Duda, 1940)
 Tolmerus strymonicus (Tsacas, 1960)
 Tolmerus tesselatus (Loew, 1849)
 Tolmerus tivonensis (Theodor, 1980)
 Tolmerus trifissilis (Séguy, 1929)
 Tolmerus vadimi (Lehr, 1981)
 Tolmerus ventriculus (Becker, 1923)
 Tolmerus vividus (Lehr, 1981)
 Tolmerus weinbergae (Hradský & Bosák, 2006)
 Tolmerus wraniki (Geller-Grimm, 2002)

Genus Torasilus
 Torasilus solus (Londt, 2005)

Genus Torebroma
 Torebroma gymnops (Hull, 1957)

Genus Townsendia 
 Townsendia albomacula (Martin, 1966)
 Townsendia araguensis (Kaletta, 1976)
 Townsendia arenicola (Scarbrough, 1995)
 Townsendia argyrata (Curran, 1926)
 Townsendia dilata (Martin, 1966)
 Townsendia fiebrigii (Bezzi, 1909)
 Townsendia gracilis (Martin, 1966)
 Townsendia minuta (Williston, 1895)
 Townsendia nemacula (Martin, 1966)
 Townsendia podexargenteus (Enderlein, 1914)
 Townsendia pulcherrima (Back, 1909)
 Townsendia triangulata (Martin, 1966)

Genus Tricella
 Tricella calcar (Daniels, 1975)

Genus Trichardis
 Trichardis afanasievae (Lehr, 1964)
 Trichardis apicalis (Oldroyd, 1974)
 Trichardis cinctella (Séguy, 1934)
 Trichardis cribrata (Loew, 1858)
 Trichardis katangaensis (Oldroyd, 1970)
 Trichardis lucifer (Oldroyd, 1974)
 Trichardis mongolica (Richter, 1972)
 Trichardis nigrescens (Ricardo, 1903)
 Trichardis picta (Hermann, 1906)
 Trichardis pohli (Geller-Grimm, 2002)
 Trichardis terminalis (Oldroyd, 1974)
 Trichardis turneri (Oldroyd, 1974)

Genus Trichardopsis
 Trichardopsis dolicharista (Lehr, 1963)

Genus Trichomachimus
 Trichomachimus angustus (Shi, 1992)
 Trichomachimus arnaudi (Joseph & Parui, 1997)
 Trichomachimus baratovi (Lehr, 1989)
 Trichomachimus basalis (Oldroyd, 1964)
 Trichomachimus conjugus (Shi, 1992)
 Trichomachimus curtusus (Lehr, 1989)
 Trichomachimus dontus (Shi, 1992)
 Trichomachimus elongatus (Shi, 1992)
 Trichomachimus excelsus (Ricardo, 1922)
 Trichomachimus grandis (Shi, 1992)
 Trichomachimus himachali (Parui & Kaur & Kapoor, 1994)
 Trichomachimus hirsutus (Bromley, 1935)
 Trichomachimus inundatus (Lehr, 1989)
 Trichomachimus kashmirensis (Oldroyd, 1964)
 Trichomachimus klapperichi (Moucha & Hradský, 1964)
 Trichomachimus lobus (Shi, 1992)
 Trichomachimus maculatus (Shi, 1992)
 Trichomachimus marginis (Shi, 1992)
 Trichomachimus nigricornis (Shi, 1992)
 Trichomachimus nigritarsus (Shi, 1992)
 Trichomachimus nigrus (Shi, 1992)
 Trichomachimus obliquus (Shi, 1992)
 Trichomachimus oldroydi (Moucha & Hradský, 1964)
 Trichomachimus omani (Parui & Joseph, 1994)
 Trichomachimus opulentus (Walker, 1851)
 Trichomachimus orientalis (Ricardo, 1922)
 Trichomachimus pallipes (Ricardo, 1922)
 Trichomachimus paludicola (Lehr, 1967)
 Trichomachimus pubescens (Ricardo, 1922)
 Trichomachimus quinlani (Oldroyd, 1964)
 Trichomachimus rubisetosus (Oldroyd, 1964)
 Trichomachimus rufus (Shi, 1992)
 Trichomachimus tenuis (Shi, 1992)
 Trichomachimus tubus (Shi, 1992)

Genus Trichoura
 Trichoura krugeri (Londt, 1994)
 Trichoura mesochora (Londt, 1994)
 Trichoura pardeos (Londt and Dikow, 2016)
 Trichoura proctomeces (Londt, 1994)
 Trichoura tankwa (Londt, 1994)
 Trichoura torynopoda (Londt, 1994)
 Trichoura tyligma (Londt, 1994)

Genus Triclioscelis
 Triclioscelis perfecta (Curran, 1934)
 Triclioscelis salti (Curran, 1931)

Genus Triclis
 Triclis octodecimnotatus (Costa, 1893)
 Triclis rufescens (Austen, 1914)

Genus Trigonomima
 Trigonomima anmaliensis (Joseph & Parui, 1997)
 Trigonomima apipes (Enderlein, 1914)
 Trigonomima argentea (Shi, 1992)
 Trigonomima canifrons (Enderlein, 1914)
 Trigonomima cyanella (Osten-Sacken, 1882)
 Trigonomima fuscopoda (Joseph & Parui, 1997)
 Trigonomima gibbera (Shi, 1992)
 Trigonomima nigra (Shi, 1992)
 Trigonomima penecyanella (Tomosovic, 2005)
 Trigonomima pennipes (Hermann, 1914)

Genus Triorla
 Triorla parastriola (Pamplona & Cima & Aires, 1999)
 Triorla spinosa (Tomasovic, 2002)
 Triorla trichinus (Tomasovic, 2002)

Genus Tsacasia
 Tsacasia wagneri (Artigas & Papavero, 1995)

Genus Tsacasiella
 Tsacasiella debilis (Tsacas, 1969)
 Tsacasiella exilis (Tsacas, 1969)
 Tsacasiella inornata (Londt, 2002)
 Tsacasiella instabilis (Tsacas, 1969)
 Tsacasiella kivuensis (Tsacas, 1969)

Genus Tuberculefferia
 Tuberculefferia producta (Hine, 1919)
 Tuberculefferia setigera (Wilcox, 1966)
 Tuberculefferia spiniventris (Hine, 1919)
 Tuberculefferia tuberculata (Coquillett, 1904)
 Tuberculefferia tucsoni (Wilcox, 1966)

Genus Turkiella
 Turkiella nudus (Lehr, 1996)
 Turkiella zaitzevi (Lehr, 1996)

References 

 
Asilidae